Cheall v APEX [1983] 2 AC 180 is a UK labour law case, concerning the governance of trade unions in the United Kingdom.

Facts
Mr Cheall was expelled by Association of Professional, Executive, Clerical and Computer Staff (APEX) after he accepted membership, because he was a member of another union. He knew he was a member of Association of Clerical, Technical and Supervisory Staffs. ACTSS complained to the TUC that APEX acted in breach of the Bridlington Principles. Mr Cheall challenged his expulsion, which followed the union's rules.

In the High Court, Bingham J held that the union rule applied, so Mr Cheall could be expelled. The Court of Appeal overturned the High Court.

Judgment
The House of Lords, Lord Diplock giving the lead judgment, held that the TUC Disputes Committee was entitled to hear the claim before it made its decision. Mr Cheall had no standing to be heard in the hearing between ACTTS and the TUC. He was also not entitled to be heard by APEX ‘where nothing he said could affect the outcome.’ He said the following.

See also

UK labour law

Notes

References

United Kingdom labour case law